Protea rupicola, also known as the krantz sugarbush, is a flowering shrub belonging to the genus Protea. It has a highly branched trunk and grows up to 2m high. 

In Afrikaans it is known as the kranssuikerbos. 

The tree's national number is 88.2.

Distribution 
The plant is endemic to South Africa, where it is native to the Western Cape and the Eastern Cape. The plant is only found extremely localized near mountain tops, from in the mountain ranges of Groot Winterhoek and Klein Winterhoek through the Hottentots Holland Mountains and Langeberg in the Western Cape, to the part of the Groot Swartberg mountains which lies in the Eastern Cape.

Ecology
It is a rare plant. It prefers sandstone, crest reefs and rock slopes, at heights of 1,300 to 2,000 m above sea level.

References

rupicola
Flora of South Africa